The 1966 Tirreno–Adriatico was the first edition of the Tirreno–Adriatico cycle race and was held from 11 March to 13 March 1966. The race started in Rome and finished in Pescara. The race was won by Dino Zandegù.

General classification

References

1966
1966 in Italian sport